David's Midnight Magic is a pinball simulation video game written by David Snider for the Apple II and published by Broderbund in 1982. The game was published in Europe by Ariolasoft. A port to the Atari 8-bit family was released the same year, then the Commodore 64 in 1983. In 1987 Atari Corporation published a cartridge in the styling of the then-new Atari XEGS.

Gameplay

David's Midnight Magic is closely modeled after the popular real-life pinball table Black Knight, released by Williams in 1980.

Reception
Softline stated that David's Midnight Magic "ratifies Bill Budge's extraordinary program as a programming tour de force", as it was only equal to Budge's Raster Blaster despite being released nine months later. The magazine concluded that "the fact that [David is] second should not dull the glitter of this effort". Computer Gaming World stated that Midnight Magic was a better game than Raster Blaster, but lamented the requirement of removing write protection from the floppy, thus voiding the warranty, in order to save high scores. The Commodore 64 Home Companion called the game "extraordinarily realistic ... complete with all the features that make pinball so seductive".

David's Midnight Magic won "Computer Game of the Year" at the 4th annual Arkie Awards, where judges described it as "a program that is both an exciting video game and a fairly faithful evocation of pinball mystique".

Legacy
Atari Corporation released a pinball game called Midnight Magic for the Atari 2600 that plays differently from the similarly named David's Midnight Magic.

Doug Carlston of Broderbund said in 1983 that Snider earned "somewhere in the six figures" in royalties from David's Midnight Magic. Snider's brother Eric later used his first name in the title of Eric's Ultimate Solitaire.

In 2005, a Visual Pinball recreation of David's Midnight Magic was created called David's Midnight Magic 2005 which is rendered with modern 3D graphics.

See also
Raster Blaster, 1981 Apple II pinball game

References

External links
Gamegrid (Telematch) - Interview with David Snider (in German)

Pinball video games
Apple II games
Atari 8-bit family games
Commodore 64 games
1982 video games
Broderbund games
Multiplayer and single-player video games
Video games developed in the United States
Ariolasoft games